This is a list of people who served as Lord Lieutenant of County Roscommon.

There were lieutenants of counties in Ireland until the reign of James II, when they were renamed governors. The office of Lord Lieutenant was recreated on 23 August 1831. Roscommon was lost to the United Kingdom in 1922 upon the formation of the Irish Free State.

Governors

 Edward King, 1st Earl of Kingston: 1772–1797 
 Maurice Mahon, 1st Baron Hartland (died 1819)
 Sir Edward Crofton, 2nd Baronet: 1782–1797
 Charles Dillon, 12th Viscount Dillon: 1797–1813
 Thomas Mahon, 2nd Baron Hartland: –1831
 Robert King, 1st Viscount Lorton: –1831
 Arthur French: 1821–1831

Lord Lieutenants
 The 1st Viscount Lorton: 7 October 1831 – 20 November 1854 
 The 1st Baron de Freyne: 18 December 1854 – 29 September 1856
 Edward King Tenison: 4 December 1856 – 19 June 1878
 Edward Robert King-Harman: 5 October 1878 – 10 June 1888
 The 8th Earl of Kingston: 25 July 1888 – 13 January 1896
 Charles Owen O'Conor, The O'Conor Don: 5 March 1896 – 30 June 1906
 Denis Charles Joseph O'Conor: 5 September 1906 – 23 February 1917
 William John Talbot: 25 August 1917 – 1922

References

Roscommon